Deh Mahmud (also Romanized as Deh Maḩmūd, Deh-e Maḩmood, and Deh-e Maḩmūd; also known as Deh-e Moḩammad) is a village in Chahar Gonbad Rural District, in the Central District of Sirjan County, Kerman Province, Iran. At the 2006 census, its population was 13, in 4 families.

References 

Populated places in Sirjan County